Circuitry Man is a 1990 American post apocalyptic science fiction film directed by Steven Lovy and starring Jim Metzler, Dana Wheeler-Nicholson and Vernon Wells. It was followed by a sequel, Plughead Rewired: Circuitry Man II, in 1994.

Synopsis 
In a post-apocalyptic future, pollution has killed off the natural world and the population is forced to live underground. A woman attempts to smuggle a suitcase of contraband drug/chips from Los Angeles to the underground remnants of New York City, while eluding both police and gangsters. Along the way, she is aided by a romantic bio-mechanical pony-tailed android and pursued by Plughead, a villain with the ability to tap into people's minds.

Cast 
 Jim Metzler as Danner
 Dana Wheeler-Nicholson as Lori
 Lu Leonard as Juice
 Vernon Wells as Plughead
 Barbara Alyn Woods as Yoyo
 Dennis Christopher as Leech
 Steven Bottomley as Bartender
 Barney Burman as Cheater
 Andy Goldberg as Squid
 Garry Goodrow as Jugs
 Darren Lott as Jackie

Production 
Circuitry Man was adapted from a student film  Steven Lovy made while attending UCLA.  Shooting began in July 1989 and took place in Los Angeles and Antelope Valley, California.

Reception 
Kevin Thomas of the Los Angeles Times called it "nothing if not derivative" but "consistently distinctive and funny".  In The Psychotronic Video Guide, Michael Weldon described it as "a clever, sometimes funny, well-made science fiction adventure" that is more fun than Hardware or Total Recall, two science fiction films that were also released in 1990.  Tech Noir author Paul Meehan, discussing film noir in science fiction, wrote that the film attempts to overcome its low budget with gratuitous violence but called Wells "memorably nasty".

References

External links 
 

1990 films
1990s science fiction action films
American independent films
Cyberpunk films
American post-apocalyptic films
American science fiction action films
Films set in the future
I.R.S. Media films
1990s English-language films
1990s American films